Gejza Šimanský  (born 29 August 1924 in Sečovce, died 19 June 2007) was a former Slovak footballer who played for ŠK Slovan Bratislava and FC Tatran Prešov during the 1940s and 1950s.

Club career
Šimanský made 212 appearances and scored 85 goals in the Czechoslovakian I. liga over 18 seasons.

International career
Šimanský made 15 appearances and scored 7 goals for the full Czechoslovakia national football team from 1947 through 1955.

References

1924 births
2007 deaths
Czechoslovak footballers
Czechoslovakia international footballers
ŠK Slovan Bratislava players
Czechoslovak football managers
1. FC Tatran Prešov managers
Association football forwards
People from Sečovce
Sportspeople from the Košice Region